Little Wigborough is a village and former civil parish, now in the parish of Great and Little Wigborough, in the Colchester borough of Essex, England and forms part of Winstred Hundred Parish Council.  
Little Wigborough is located between Peldon and Great Wigborough. In 1951 the parish had a population of 45.

The parish church is dedicated to St Nicholas. It is a Grade II* listed building dating from the 15th century.

History
The place-name 'Wigborough' is first attested in the Domesday Book of 1086, where it appears as Wicgebergha and Wigheberga. Little Wigborough is first referred to in the Valuation of Norwich of 1254, where it appears as Wigeberwe Parva. The name means 'Wicga's hill or barrow'.

In the early hours of 24 September 1916, the German Army Zeppelin L33 was returning from a bombing raid on London, when it hit by an anti-aircraft shell and further damaged by Royal Flying Corps aircraft. It made a forced landing in the village, close to New Hall farm. The crew tried to burn the wreckage but they were only partially successful. They were arrested by the local special constable as they walked away from the scene. A pen drawing with pencil of the Zeppelin by the Scottish artist Adam Bruce Thomson is on display at the Scottish National Portrait Gallery.

On 1 April 1953 the parish was abolished and merged with Great Wigborough to form "Great and Little Wigborough".

Geography
Most of Little Wigborough’s official village area is Copt Hall Marshes, a marshland and National Trust Nature Reserve to the south of the village.   The village boundary stretches to the north up to Abberton Reservoir. However, it does also have an exclave, to the west of the village, which includes Maldon Road and stretches to Salcott Creek in the south. The reasons for this exclave are unknown.

References

External links 

 http://www.britishlistedbuildings.co.uk/search?q=Little+Wigborough
 https://merseamuseum.org.uk/mmwig.php - contains additional history of Great and Little Wigborough

Villages in Essex
Former civil parishes in Essex
Borough of Colchester